Jessie Road Bridge Halt was an intermediate station situated on the Southsea Railway between Fratton and Albert Road Bridge Halt (sometimes called Highland Road).

Opened in 1904 and closed a decade later it was part of a concerted effort to boost revenue and thus see off competition from the burgeoning tramway network. The station's only platform was on the down line, the up line being out of use. The final nail in the line's coffin was a government directive issued shortly after the declaration of war that railways unable to support themselves would cease operations at the earliest opportunity; and, as the line clearly fell into this category, the last train ran early in August 1914.

See also 
List of closed railway stations in Britain

References

External links 
Intermediate halts listed
Halt mentioned in short story

Disused railway stations in Portsmouth
Former Portsmouth and Ryde Joint Railway stations
Railway stations in Great Britain opened in 1904
Railway stations in Great Britain closed in 1914